Ambulyx johnsoni is a species of moth of the  family Sphingidae.

Distribution 
It is known from the Philippines.

Description 
The wingspan is about 50 mm. It is similar to Ambulyx liturata but smaller, the upperside and underside of the wings is more yellowish and the underside of the palps, thorax, abdomen and bases of both wings are pinkish. The forewing upperside submarginal line is close to the fringe posteriorly both dorsally and ventrally and the pale band just proximal to the submarginal dark band is less prominent than in Ambulyx liturata.

References

Ambulyx
Moths described in 1917
Moths of Asia